Johnny Ecker (born 16 January 1973) is a French former professional footballer who played as a defender.

At club level, he played for Lille OSC, Olympique Marseille, Guingamp, Bagnols-sur-Cèze, and Beaucaire. He retired in 2011.

References

External links
 
 

Living people
1973 births
French footballers
Footballers from Rouen
Association football defenders
Lille OSC players
Olympique de Marseille players
En Avant Guingamp players
Nîmes Olympique players
Stade Beaucairois players